Khaleda Adib Chowdhury ( – 28 May 2008) was a Bangladeshi writer. She was the recipient of 1993 Bangla Academy Literary Award.

Biography
Chowdhury was born in 1937. She served as a government officer, teacher, journalist and later, a writer. She published over 42 books.

Chowdhury was married to Anwarul Haq. Together they had three children – Sangita, Tanvirul Huq Probal and Sumona Haque, who is a noted singer.

Works
 Amar Deho Amar Haat (1978)
 Pantho Tomar Bhalobasha (1983)
 Tomar Onongo (1986)
 Duhaate Andhar Kete (1993)
 Hae Badhon Lotar Kadon (1995)
 Premer Kobita (1998)
 Nirob Narsisus Obhimaan Aache Bedonae, Poems (2001)

Awards
 Bangla Academy Literary Award (1993)
 Alaol Literature Award
 Poet Jashim Uddin Parsiahd Literature Award
 Bangladesh Lekhika Shongho Award
 Agrani Bank Shishu Shahitto Award
 M Nurul Kader Foundation Shahitto Award
 Dhaka Mahila Club Podok
 Ushi Shahitto Award (Comilla)

References

1937 births
2008 deaths
People from Comilla
Bangladeshi women writers
Bangladeshi writers
Bangladeshi women poets
Recipients of Bangla Academy Award